The green-headed sunbird (Cyanomitra verticalis) is a species of bird in the family Nectariniidae.
It is found in Angola, Benin, Burkina Faso, Burundi, Cameroon, Central African Republic, Republic of the Congo, Democratic Republic of the Congo, Ivory Coast, Equatorial Guinea, Gabon, Gambia, Ghana, Guinea, Guinea-Bissau, Kenya, Liberia, Malawi, Mali, Nigeria, Rwanda, Senegal, Sierra Leone, South Sudan, Tanzania, Togo, Uganda, and Zambia.

References

Cyanomitra
Birds of Sub-Saharan Africa
Birds of East Africa
Taxonomy articles created by Polbot